is a railway station on the West Japan Railway Company Hanwa Line in Sugimoto Sanchome, Sumiyoshi-ku, Osaka, Osaka Prefecture, Japan.

Layout 
 There are two island platforms with four tracks; however, Tracks 1 and 3 are fenced as trains on these tracks pass through the station without stopping.

History 

 1929 - Station opened
 March 2018 - Station numbering was introduced with Sugimotochō being assigned station number JR-R26.

Former adjacent stations

References 

Railway stations in Japan opened in 1929
Railway stations in Osaka Prefecture